Haliophyle euclidias is a moth of the family Noctuidae. It is endemic to Kauai. The larvae feed on ferns.

References

Hadeninae
Endemic moths of Hawaii